Peter Fleming and John McEnroe were the defending champions, but McEnroe did not participate this year.  Fleming partnered Sandy Mayer, losing in the semifinals.

Marty Riessen and Sherwood Stewart won the title, defeating Brian Gottfried and Raúl Ramírez 6–2, 6–2 in the final.

Seeds

Draw

Finals

Top half

Bottom half

References
Draw

U.S. Pro Indoor
1981 Grand Prix (tennis)